Allen Creek is a stream in Scotland County, Missouri.

A variant name was "Allens Branch". The creek has the name of the local Allen family.

See also
List of rivers of Missouri

References

Rivers of Scotland County, Missouri
Rivers of Missouri